Ioannis Despotopoulos (7 January 1903 – 1992), also known as Jan Despo, was a Greek architect born in Smyrna (modern Izmir), Aidin Vilayet, Ottoman Empire.

Biography 
Despotopoulos was born in Smyrna, Asia Minor in 1903; soon after he was born, his family moved to the island of Chios where he grew up. He moved to Athens to study architecture. He was enrolled student at the National Technical University of Athens (N.T.U.A.) until he quit and left to study at the Bauhaus in Weimar. He then moved to Leibniz University Hannover, graduating from there in 1927.

It was 1930 when he returned to Greece. By 1943 (during the occupation of Greece by Nazi Germany), Ioannis Despotopoulos became professor at the School of Architecture at the N.T.U.A. In 1946, he was discharged from his position at the university and he moved to Sweden for a period between the years 1947 and 1961. During his stay in Sweden, he worked as an architect and also taught at the Polytechnic Institutes of Stockholm and Goeteborg. He returned to Greece in 1961 and appointed immediately as a professor at the N.T.U.A. until 1968 when he retired. He died in 1992.

Major works 
Church of the Magaziotissa on Chios
Municipal baths of Chios
Sotiria Sanatorium, Athens
Tripoli Sanatorium
Asvestohori Hospital
Chios Movie Theatre
Akadimia Platonos School Complex
Athens Conservatoire.

References 

1903 births
1992 deaths
Bauhaus alumni
People from İzmir
People from Aidin vilayet
Smyrniote Greeks
Greeks from the Ottoman Empire
National Technical University of Athens alumni
Academic staff of the National Technical University of Athens
20th-century Greek architects
Greek expatriates in Germany
Emigrants from the Ottoman Empire to Greece
Greek expatriates in Sweden